CoH and COH may refer to:

 CoH (musician), Russian electronics musician, also known as Ivan Pavlov
 Cash on hand, see Reserve (accounting)
 Cathedral of Hope (Dallas)
 Central Oak Heights, a summer cottage community in Kelly Township, Pennsylvania
 The Children of Húrin, a novel by J. R. R. Tolkien
 Christian Outreach to the Handicapped, a disability organisation in Singapore
 City of Heroes, a massively multiplayer online role-playing computer game based on superhero comics
 City of Houston, Texas
 Coalition on Homelessness
 Coalition on Homelessness, San Francisco
 Corporal of Horse, a British Army cavalry rank
 Company of Heroes, a real-time strategy computer game based on World War II
 Company of Heroes: Opposing Fronts
 Company of Heroes: Tales of Valor
 Coach Inc. (stock symbol: COH)
 Crowborough railway station (station code: COH), East Sussex, England
 RAF Coltishall (ICAO: COH), Norfolk, East Anglia